The Spider Sapphire Mystery is the forty-fifth volume in the Nancy Drew Mystery Stories series. It was first published in 1968 under the pseudonym Carolyn Keene. The actual author was ghostwriter Harriet Stratemeyer Adams.

Plot 
A client of Carson Drew, a Mr. Floyd Ramsey, is accused of stealing the fabulous Spider Sapphire which leads Nancy and her friends to Africa. Nancy uncovers a notorious scheme and solves the mystery of a missing safari guide.

References

External links
 

Nancy Drew books
1968 American novels
1968 children's books
Children's mystery novels
Grosset & Dunlap books
Novels set in Africa